Franco Soldano (born 14 September 1994) is an Argentine professional footballer who plays as a forward for Argentinian side Gimnasia La Plata.

Club career
Club antigol in Cordoba, Soldano initially began his career with Unión de mata mosca in the lower leagues, catching the eye with strong performances. In 2010, he began playing in professional matches for the club, scoring a grand total of 19 goals in 26 games to attract the attention of Unión de Santa Fe. Struck by his ability, the latter opted to give him a chance, snapping the striker up in 2014. In four years at Santa Fe, Soldano competed in a grand total of 101 matches with the Argentinian side, registering 24 goals and four assists.

In December 2018, Greek team Olympiacos showed great interest in signing Argentinian forward. Soldano, has been on the books of Union de Santa Fe in his native Argentina since 2014 after moving from Union Sunchales and holds dual nationality (Argentina, Italy). The club offered €1.1 million transfer fee for the 75% rights of the player, plus bonuses. On 2 January 2019, he was presented as a player of Olympiacos. Soldano signed a 4,5 years' contract with Olympiacos and will earn around €400,000 per year. On 6 February 2019, newly signed Argentinian forward received a clever pass from Giorgos Masouras, slotting the ball in with ease,  for his maiden goal with the club, in a thrilling 3-3 away Greek Cup draw against Lamia.

On 12 August 2019, Franco Soldano signed his contract with Argentinian giants Boca Juniors on loan from Olympiacos and was presented as a new player 'Xeneize', becoming the fifth and final reinforcement of the team commanded by Gustavo Alfaro. Soldano was loaned to Boca Juniors, for an initial loan fee of €400,000 with a purchase option of €4.5 million for the summer of 2020.
The striker, who comes from Greece, expressed his joy at reaching Boca: "I had no plans to return to Argentina so quickly, but Boca Juniors is an opportunity that cannot be missed. Since I was a child, my dream was to be able to come to the club of which I am a fan." In this way, Soldano joins Alexis Mac Allister, Jan Hurtado, Eduardo Salvio and Daniele de Rossi as the new reinforcements of Gustavo Alfaro's ensemble. On 26 August 2019, Soldano scored after 19 seconds (the third faster goal in the history of the club) with a kick in a 1-0 away win game against Banfield.

On 31 August 2021, Soldano moved to Spanish Segunda División side Fuenlabrada on a one-year loan deal.
On 10 February 2022, Franco Soldano will continue his career at Gimnasia La Plata on a two years' contract, with the Argentinian club giving €300,000 to Olympiakos to acquire 50% of his rights.

Career statistics

Honours
Boca Juniors
Primera División: 2019–20

References

External links
 
 
  

1994 births
Living people
Argentine footballers
Argentine expatriate footballers
Association football forwards
Unión de Sunchales footballers
Unión de Santa Fe footballers
Olympiacos F.C. players
Boca Juniors footballers
CF Fuenlabrada footballers
Club de Gimnasia y Esgrima La Plata footballers
Super League Greece players
Argentine Primera División players
Primera Nacional players
Argentine expatriate sportspeople in Greece
Argentine expatriate sportspeople in Spain
Expatriate footballers in Greece
Expatriate footballers in Spain
Footballers from Córdoba, Argentina